Florence is a western rig dragger located at Mystic Seaport in Mystic, Connecticut, United States. Florence was built in 1926 by Franklin G. Post along the Mystic River and was used as a dragger in Long Island Sound. In 1982 Florence was acquired by Mystic Seaport and completely restored to her original configuration. Florence is the only working dragger in a museum collection. Florence is now used to carry students to collect marine biology specimens from Fishers Island Sound.

References

Fishing ships of the United States
Museum ships in Mystic, Connecticut
1926 ships
Ships built in Mystic, Connecticut